The 2022 Oeiras Ladies Open was a professional tennis tournament played on outdoor clay courts. It was the second edition of the tournament which was part of the 2022 ITF Women's World Tennis Tour. It took place in Oeiras, Portugal between 4 and 10 April 2022.

Singles main draw entrants

Seeds

 1 Rankings are as of 21 March 2022.

Other entrants
The following players received wildcards into the singles main draw:
  Matilde Jorge
  Francisca Jorge
  Ana Filipa Santos
  Natalija Stevanović

The following player received entry using a junior exempt:
  Petra Marčinko

The following player received entry as a special exempt:
  Léolia Jeanjean

The following players received entry from the qualifying draw:
  Elisabetta Cocciaretto
  Ingrid Gamarra Martins
  Katharina Gerlach
  Justina Mikulskytė
  Andreea Mitu
  Ashley Lahey
  Stefania Rubini
  Nastasja Schunk

The following players received entry as lucky losers:
  Alicia Barnett
  Jéssica Bouzas Maneiro
  Natalia Vikhlyantseva

Champions

Singles

  Elisabetta Cocciaretto def.  Viktoriya Tomova, 7–6(7–5), 2–6, 7–5

Doubles

  Katarzyna Piter /  Kimberley Zimmermann def.  Katharina Gerlach /  Natalija Stevanović 6–1, 6–1

References

External links
 2022 Oeiras Ladies Open at ITFtennis.com

2022 ITF Women's World Tennis Tour
2022 in Portuguese sport
April 2022 sports events in Portugal